Symphony Hall is a Sirius XM Radio station featuring exclusively classical music. It is located on Sirius XM Radio channel 76 and DISH Network channel 6076. Originally Sirius only, it was merged with the XM Classics channel on November 12, 2008.

Pablo Salazar is the current Program Director for Symphony Hall, Symphony Hall Just Music, SiriusXM Pops and Strings.

Martin Goldsmith (former longtime host of the then-National Public Radio program Performance Today), Preston Trombly, Robert Aubry Davis, Lauren Rico, John Clare and Vincent Caruso are the channel's current on-air voices.  Special programs include: SiriusXM Presents The Philadelphia Orchestra, Living American, Classics On Film, Weekend Pops, Millennium of Music, Vox Choral, Baroque and Beyond, The weekend show with Martin Goldsmith and The Chamber Music Society of Lincoln Center. The channel also carried the syndicated daily program Exploring Music prior to April 2010.

Between 12 AM and 6 AM (ET), the channel's programming consists of automated classical music selections, with no on-air hosts.

Since the Sirius XM merger, Symphony Hall competed with Sirius XM Pops for classical music listeners. However, on July 10, 2014, Sirius XM announced Sirius XM Pops would close and merge with Symphony Hall. The former Sirius XM Pops station is still available as an online-only station on the Sirius XM app.

Holiday Pops
Beginning on noon Christmas Eve through Christmas Day each year Symphony Hall is preempted on the Satellite service by Holiday Pops, one of Sirius XM's holiday stations that plays classical Christmas music featuring both vocal and instrumental holiday pieces. During this time, the regular Symphony Hall programming is still available as an online station. Holiday Pops is available for a longer period online where it begins on the first Monday in December and runs until Christmas Day.

Core artists
John Adams
Ludwig van Beethoven
Johann Sebastian Bach
Joshua Bell
Johannes Brahms
Antonin Dvorak
Gustavo Dudamel
Joseph Haydn
Jennifer Higdon
Yuja Wang
Alan Hovhaness
Arcangelo Corelli
Sergei Rachmaninoff
Wolfgang Amadeus Mozart
Aaron Copland

See also
 List of Sirius Satellite Radio stations
 List of XM Satellite Radio channels

References

External links
 Symphony Hall - Canadian Communication Foundation

Sirius Satellite Radio channels
Sirius XM Radio channels
Classical music radio stations in the United States
Radio stations established in 2008